Merritt Island, Florida, is a census-designated place in Brevard County as well as the peninsula where it is located.

Merritt Island may also refer to:

 Merritt Island Airport (IATA airport code: COI, ICAO airport code: KCOI), an airport on the peninsula
 Merritt Island National Wildlife Refuge, on the peninsula in Florida
 Kennedy Space Center (KSC) NASA spaceport on the peninsula in Florida
 Merritt Island High School, Merrit Island, Brevard County, Florida, USA
 Merritt Island AVA, Yolo County, California, USA; an island

See also